François Remetter (8 August 1928 – 30 September 2022) was a French footballer who played as a goalkeeper. He was the last surviving member of the French 1954 FIFA World Cup squad.

International career
Remetter played for France at the World Cup finals of 1954 and 1958.

References and notes

External links
 
 
 Player bio at the official web site of the French Football Federation 
 Profile at racingstub.com
 Profile at FC Metz

1928 births
2022 deaths
Footballers from Strasbourg
French people of German descent
French footballers
Association football goalkeepers
France international footballers
Ligue 1 players
RC Strasbourg Alsace players
FC Metz players
FC Sochaux-Montbéliard players
FC Girondins de Bordeaux players
Limoges FC players
ASPV Strasbourg players
1954 FIFA World Cup players
1958 FIFA World Cup players